Hypostomus alatus is a species of catfish in the family Loricariidae. It is native to South America, where it occurs in the basin of the Das Velhas River, which itself is part of the São Francisco River basin in the coastal drainage of eastern Brazil, although it has also been reported from Argentina. The species reaches 28.8 cm (11.3 inches) SL.

References 

alatus
Fish of the São Francisco River basin
Fish described in 1855